The Mount Sinai School District is a United States educational division of the Mount Sinai, New York community in the Town of Brookhaven on the north shore of Long Island.  Established in 1870, the district oversees three schools that serve approximately 2,200 students located in a six square mile area.  The Board of Education for the district consists of seven members, including a president and a vice-president. The 2020-2021 budget was about $61,000,000. The location of the original school building is unknown; however, tradition places it on North Country Road east of Mt Sinai Coram Road. The second one-room school was built in 1870 on a half acre of land on the southeast corner of North Country and Mt Sinai Coram Road and in 1908 a second classroom was added. This building served the community until 1960. At that time the community decided to send their children to be educated in Port Jefferson School District. In 1960, the school was moved and a firehouse was built on the original property.

Schools

Mount Sinai Elementary School
Opened in 1966, serving grades kindergarten through 4th grade. The current principal is Dr. Rob Catlin. The interim elementary assistant principal is Brian McCarthy.

Mount Sinai Middle School
Opened in 1978, serving grades 5th through 8th. The current principal is Elizabeth Hine and the assistant principal is Christopher Heil.

Robert M. Grable Mount Sinai High School
Formerly opened as Mount Sinai High School in 1991 for 9th through 12th grades. The principal through the 2018–2019 school year was Robert Grable until his passing on July 19, 2019. On July 22, 2019, at the vigil for the late Robert Grable, it was announced the school was to be renamed the Robert M. Grable Memorial High School, pending a Board of Education vote on August 28, 2019. The Board of Education subsequently approved renaming the school to Robert M. Grable Mount Sinai High School. The assistant principals are Frank LaBianca and Matthew Dyroff. On August 23, 2019, Superintendent Gordon Brosdal announced that former Middle School principal, Peter Pramataris, will take the role as interim high school principal. The current high school administration includes Peter Pramataris as high school principal, and Christina Romeo and Matthew Dyroff as assistant principals.

Student Activities

Mt. Sinai School District features many clubs, both nationally recognized and independent, as well as sports. Students in all three schools have the opportunity to join these clubs, and students in the Middle and High schools can try out for the sports teams.

Clubs
Some clubs offered at the school include National Honor Society, Future Business Leaders of America, Best Buddies, Model U.N., S.T.E.M. Project, a GSA, and much more.

Notable alumni
 Joseph Patrick Dwyer, soldier (Class of 1994)
  Greg Marasciulo, professional wrestler (Class of 2005)
  Philip Scholz, author; swimmer and 2008 Paralympian (Class of 2007)
  Julia Smit, swimmer and 2008 Olympian (Class of 2006)

References

External links
 

Education in Suffolk County, New York
School districts in New York (state)
School districts established in 1870
1870 establishments in New York (state)